Sports venues in Bedfordshire
Bedfordshire
King G
Lists of buildings and structures in Bedfordshire